The Tesino is a  Italian river which flows through the region of Marche. It is born on the slopes of Monte La Torre, near Force in the Province of Ascoli Piceno, and enters the Adriatic near Grottammare

Adriatic Italian coast basins
Rivers of the Province of Ascoli Piceno
Rivers of Italy